Kenny Elissonde (born 22 July 1991) is a French professional road cyclist, who currently rides for UCI WorldTeam .

Career
Elissonde is a climbing specialist, having won the prestigious stage up the Alto de l'Angliru at the 2013 Vuelta a España.

He was the first French rider to be a member of the team since Nicolas Portal was part of the inaugural squad back in 2010. In August 2020, he was named in the startlist for the Tour de France.

In 2021, he earned the combativity award for his efforts on stage eleven of the Tour de France. During the Vuelta a España he was involved in a successful breakaway on stage three, where he finished third; two days later, he moved into the overall race lead for a day.

Major results

2008
 1st  Road race, National Junior Road Championships
2009
 8th Overall Tour du Valromey
1st  Mountains classification
1st Stages 1 & 3
2010
 7th Overall Giro della Valle d'Aosta Mont Blanc
2011
 1st  Overall Ronde de l'Isard
1st Stage 2
 7th Liège–Bastogne–Liège Espoirs
2012
 Paris–Corrèze
1st  Points classification
1st Stage 2
 4th Overall Route du Sud
2013
 1st Stage 20 Vuelta a España
 7th Overall Tour de l'Ain
1st  Young rider classification
 7th Boucles de l'Aulne
 8th Overall Tour of Oman
1st  Young rider classification
2014
 7th Overall Route du Sud
2015
 7th Tre Valli Varesine
2016
 Vuelta a España
Held  after Stages 14–19
2017
 3rd Overall Herald Sun Tour
 3rd Overall Route du Sud
2018
 3rd Overall Route d'Occitanie
 10th Overall Vuelta a Burgos
2019
 7th Overall Herald Sun Tour
2020
 7th Mont Ventoux Dénivelé Challenge
2021
 6th Mont Ventoux Dénivelé Challenge
 Vuelta a España
Held  after Stage 5
  Combativity award Stage 11 Tour de France
2022
 5th Overall Giro di Sicilia
 10th Overall Vuelta a Burgos

Grand Tour general classification results timeline

References

External links

Kenny Elissonde profile at FDJ-BigMat

1991 births
Living people
French male cyclists
People from Longjumeau
French Vuelta a España stage winners
Sportspeople from Essonne
Olympic cyclists of France
Cyclists at the 2020 Summer Olympics
Cyclists from Île-de-France
21st-century French people